A Google matrix is a particular stochastic matrix that is used by Google's PageRank algorithm. The matrix represents a graph with edges representing links between pages. The PageRank of each page can then be generated iteratively from the Google matrix using the power method. However, in order for the power method to converge, the matrix must be stochastic, irreducible and aperiodic.

Adjacency matrix A and Markov matrix S
In order to generate the Google matrix G, we must first generate an adjacency matrix A which represents the relations between pages or nodes.

Assuming there are N pages, we can fill out A by doing the following:

 A matrix element  is filled with 1 if node  has a link to node , and 0 otherwise; this is the adjacency matrix of links.
 A related matrix S corresponding to the transitions in a Markov chain of given network is constructed from A by dividing the elements of column "j" by a number of  where  is the total number of outgoing links from node j to all other nodes. The columns having zero matrix elements, corresponding to dangling nodes, are replaced by a constant value 1/N. Such a procedure adds a link from every sink, dangling state  to every other node.
 Now by the construction the sum of all elements in any column of matrix S is equal to unity. In this way the matrix S is mathematically well defined and it belongs to the class of Markov chains and the class of Perron-Frobenius operators. That makes S suitable for the PageRank algorithm.

Construction of Google matrix G 

Then the final Google matrix G can be expressed via S as:

 

By the construction the sum of all non-negative elements inside each matrix column is equal to unity. The numerical coefficient  is known as a damping factor.

Usually S is a sparse matrix and for modern directed networks it has only about ten nonzero elements in a line or column, thus only about 10N multiplications are needed to multiply a vector by matrix G.

Examples of Google matrix
An example of the matrix  construction via Eq.(1) within a simple network is given in the article CheiRank.

For the actual matrix, Google uses a damping factor  around 0.85. The term  gives a surfer probability to jump randomly on any page. The matrix  belongs to the class of Perron-Frobenius operators of Markov chains. The examples of Google matrix structure are shown in Fig.1 for Wikipedia articles hyperlink network in 2009 at small scale and in Fig.2 for University of Cambridge network in 2006 at large scale.

Spectrum and eigenstates of G matrix

For  there is only one maximal eigenvalue  with the corresponding right eigenvector which has non-negative elements  which can be viewed as stationary probability distribution. These probabilities ordered by their decreasing values give the PageRank vector  with the PageRank  used by Google search to rank webpages. The left eigenvector at  has constant matrix elements. With  all eigenvalues move as  except the maximal eigenvalue , which remains unchanged.

At  the matrix 
has generally many degenerate eigenvalues 
(see e.g. [6]).

The Google matrix can be also constructed for the Ulam networks generated by the Ulam method [8] for dynamical maps. The spectral properties of such matrices are discussed in [9,10,11,12,13,15]. In a number of cases the spectrum is described by the fractal Weyl law [10,12].

The Google matrix can be constructed also for other directed networks, e.g. for the procedure call network of the Linux Kernel software introduced in [15]. Numerical analysis shows that the eigenstates of matrix  are localized (see Fig.6 from ). Arnoldi iteration method allows to compute many eigenvalues and eigenvectors for matrices of rather large size [13].

Other examples of  matrix include the Google matrix of brain [17]
and business process management [18], see also. Applications of Google matrix analysis to
DNA sequences is described in [20]. Such a Google matrix approach allows also to analyze entanglement of cultures via ranking of multilingual Wikipedia articles abouts persons [21]

Historical notes
The Google matrix with damping factor was described by Sergey Brin and Larry Page in 1998 [22], see also articles on PageRank history [23],[24].

See also 
CheiRank
Arnoldi iteration
Markov chain
Transfer operator
Perron–Frobenius theorem
Web search engines

References

External links 
 Google matrix at Scholarpedia
 Google PR Shut Down
 Video lectures at IHES Workshop "Google matrix: fundamental, applications and beyond", Oct 2018

matrix
Link analysis
Markov models